Edward Everett Bruen (June 26, 1859 – May 10, 1938) was the first Mayor of East Orange, New Jersey.

Biography
He was born on June 26, 1859 in Chatham, New Jersey to Theodore Wood Bruen and Caroline D. Miller. He served as the first Mayor of East Orange, New Jersey from 1899 to 1905. In 1904 he was offered the position as president of Globe Security. He died on May 10, 1938.

References

1859 births
1938 deaths
Mayors of East Orange, New Jersey
People from Chatham Borough, New Jersey